Niklas Tim Klabunde (born 3 August 1993) is a German who lives and performs in South Korea as a television personality and model. He was a cast member in the talk-variety show Non-Summit.

Filmography

Television shows

References

External links

 

 

1993 births
Living people
German television personalities
German expatriates in South Korea
People from Hamburg
21st-century German people